The plica semilunaris is the thin upper part of the fold of mucous membrane in the supratonsillar fossa that reaches across between the two arches. A separate fold is called the plica triangularis which runs inferoposteriorly from the posterior surface of the palatoglossal arch to cover the inferior portion of the tonsil.

References 

Palate